Reepham (Norfolk) was a railway station in Reepham, Norfolk. It was opened in 1882 and closed to passengers in 1952 and finally shut to goods services in 1981.  The tracks through Reepham remained in place until 1985, latterly serving a concrete factory in Lenwade.

The trackbed is currently preserved as part of the Marriott's Way long-distance footpath.

Future operations
A speculative plan to create a heritage railway between Reepham station and Whitwell station has been proposed by the owner of the latter station, which is being developed as a railway centre.  This would include relaying the Themelthorpe Curve, built to link the former Great Eastern Railway and Midland and Great Northern Joint Railway routes - formerly the tightest radius curve on the British Rail network.

References 

Disused railway stations in Norfolk
Former Great Eastern Railway stations
Railway stations in Great Britain opened in 1882
Railway stations in Great Britain closed in 1952
Reepham, Norfolk